The Conasauga Group is a geologic group in West Virginia. It dates back to the Cambrian period.

References
 Generalized Stratigraphic Chart for West Virginia

Cambrian West Virginia